Bijgerd (also Romanized as Bījgerd; also known as Bīzh Gerd) is a village in Barf Anbar Rural District, in the Central District of Fereydunshahr County, Isfahan Province, Iran. At the 2006 census, its population was 421, in 93 families.

References 

Populated places in Fereydunshahr County